Willy Larsson (30 October 1914 – 23 August 2000) was a Danish footballer. He played in six matches for the Denmark national football team in 1939.

References

External links
 

1914 births
2000 deaths
Danish men's footballers
Denmark international footballers
Place of birth missing
Association footballers not categorized by position